Novoye Karakyure is a rural locality (a selo) in Dokuzparinsky District, Republic of Dagestan, Russia. The population was 850 as of 2010. There are 21 streets.

Geography 
Novoye Karakyure is located 4 km northeast of Usukhchay (the district's administrative centre) by road. Stary Gaptsakh and Usukhchay are the nearest rural localities.

Nationalities 
Lezgins live there.

References 

Rural localities in Dokuzparinsky District